Krasnoye Gorodishche is a rural locality (a selo) in Volokonovsky District, Belgorod Oblast, Russia. The population was 175 as of 2010. There are 2 streets.

Geography 
Krasnoye Gorodishche is located 20 km northeast of Volokonovka (the district's administrative centre) by road. Uspenka is the nearest rural locality.

References 

Rural localities in Volokonovsky District